Smouha is an upper class District in Alexandria, Egypt. It is home to the Security Directorate of Alexandria and Smouha Sporting Club. It is considered one of the civilized districts in Alexandria and has good connections to other districts.

See also 

 Neighborhoods in Alexandria

Populated places in Alexandria Governorate
Neighbourhoods of Alexandria